Scraps or batter bits or crispies are pieces of deep-fried batter left over in the fryer as a by-product of frying fish, and are served as an accompaniment to chips.  They are traditionally served free of charge with chips by some fish and chip shops in the United Kingdom, although some places charge for the scraps.

Terminology varies by region. In some parts of the north of England, they are referred to as bits or dubs; in the West Country they are known as gribbles.

See also
Feuilletine – pieces of baked crêpe batter
Tenkasu – pieces of deep-fried batter used in Japanese cuisine

References

English cuisine
British cuisine
Fast food
Deep fried foods
Yorkshire cuisine